Castletown House, Celbridge, County Kildare, Ireland, is a Palladian country house built in 1722 for William Conolly, the Speaker of the Irish House of Commons. It formed the centrepiece of an  estate.  Sold to developers in 1965, the estate is now divided between State and private ownership.

Interiors

On the piano nobile there are a series of ever grander reception rooms typical of the 1720s. The house was entered by ascending a staircase outside before coming into a large entrance hall which was graced with stucco gilding and pictures of the family. To the left is the dining room which was made out of two smaller rooms. To the right of the hall was the huge staircase itself. This was made of Portland stone and is cantilevered.

Straight on is the Green Drawing Room and was also known as the Saloon because of its position in the house. This was the room that the family used to receive their guests in before leaving and (staying on the left hand side of the house) entering the Red Drawing Room.

The Print Room is decorated with cut-outs of favourite images, following the fashion of the 1760s.  This room is on the right side and is thought to be the only surviving example of this in Ireland from this period.

Further on is the State Bedroom, which was never used by royalty as such, but by the various viceroys based in Dublin. In it are chairs which were from Venice.

History

Early history
On William Conolly's death in 1729, his widow Katherine (née Conyngham) continued living in the house and hosting extravagant entertainments there until her own death in 1752. The Castletown estate then passed to Conolly's nephew William James Conolly, MP for Ballyshannon. On William James' death in 1754 it passed to his son Tom Conolly whose wife, Lady Louisa (great-granddaughter of Charles II of England and Louise de Keroualle), finished the interior decoration during the 1760s and 1770s. Lady Louisa had grown up in Carton House, a demesne to the north east of Castletown house. Much of the work on the interior was carried out to designs of William Chambers. She also did extensive work on the grounds; the paths through the forest are still in walking condition although, due to anti-joyrider measures, several of the culverts have broken and the pathways are again subject to flooding. The drainage scheme through the woodland is ingenious, creating dry paths for walking on land that is below the watertable. The ha-ha fence is part of this intricate network.

When Tom died in 1803 he left the estate to his wife who on her own death in 1821 bequeathed it to her great-nephew, Edward Michael Pakenham, later the MP for Donegal, on condition he adopted the surname of Conolly. He was succeeded by his eldest son, another Tom Conolly, the eccentric MP for Donegal from 1849 to 1876.

Tom's eldest son Thomas inherited Castletown, but after he was killed in 1900 the estate passed to his brother Major Edward Conolly. The Conolly family continued to live in their ancestral house, latterly as the Conolly-Carews, until 1965, when it was sold by The 6th Baron Carew, along with its collections and land, to a Major Wilson for £133,000. Some of the land has been built on, although with some of the estate's features retained amongst the new structures.

Desmond Guinness and the Castletown Foundation
The house was bought in 1967 by Mariga and Desmond Guinness for £93,000 to save it from vandalism, became the flagship of the Irish Georgian Society, and was eventually handed over to the newly established Castletown Foundation.

The estate was sold on in parts, with  held as curtilage around the house, some small quantities retained privately by Desmond Guinness, the forested Crodaun Woods part sold to what became Coillte and around  acquired over time by Kildare County Council.  Most of the core estate remains as woods or green space but a large fraction in the south west was developed as Castletown Estate, controversially approaching the main house closely, and taking in the Walled Garden and the orchard (whose wall remains), which were lost.  However, some other features, such as the Gazebo, the Steward's House and a mock temple, were retained, after negotiations between developer Janus Securities and the Irish Georgian Society.

Modern times

The charitable Castletown Foundation struggled with the financial and operational demands of maintenance and ongoing restoration, and in 1994, following extensive negotiations between the foundation and the State, Castletown House, with its 120-acre residual demesne, was transferred to the Office of Public Works (OPW).

The OPW continued the programme of restoration, of both house and lands.

Across the broader former estate, and despite the protection of the house and some estate features, at least one of the outlying features, The Gazebo, was partly demolished, without planning permission, in late 2007. An enforcement notice was served on the developer concerned, and further action is expected.

In 2012, work began to restore the lake on the lawn between Castletown House and the Liffey, and this was followed in 2016 by work on the pleasure grounds behind and to the west of the house.

Current activities
Castletown House has opened its doors to various academic and artistic organisations. The first arts organisation to take up residency at Castletown House in 2007 was The Performance Corporation, a site-specific theatre company. The company operates an office from the premises as well as running rehearsals for their productions and hosting an annual international cross-artform residency programme, the  "SPACE Programme".

The OPW-Maynooth University Archive and Research Centre was launched by President Mary McAleese in November 2008. It was established to facilitate the care and study of archives and other sources dealing with the history of Irish estates, their houses and inhabitants. It also facilitates research in the decorative arts. This facility marks an exciting new collaboration between the Office of Public Works and Maynooth University. The Archive and Research Centre is located on the second floor of Castletown House.

As 2018, a weekly parkrun was taking place in the parklands of Castletown house on Saturdays.

Access and rights of way
Access by pedestrians is possible from Celbridge along the former half-mile main drive lined with lime trees. Access by car is from the north beside junction 6 of the N4 / M4 motorway, with a car park near the house. An informal footpath runs along the river Liffey, and a second path runs from the house towards Leixlip, passing the gate lodge designed by Batty Langley.

See also 
 The Wonderful Barn
 The Conolly Folly

Citations

External links

 Castletown House – official site
 Castletown House on irish-architecture.com

Houses completed in 1722
Celbridge
Buildings and structures in County Kildare
Museums in County Kildare
Historic house museums in the Republic of Ireland
Palladian architecture in Ireland
1722 establishments in Ireland
Edward Lovett Pearce buildings
Alessandro Galilei buildings